Blocc Movement is a collaboration album by American rappers Brotha Lynch Hung and C-Bo. It was released August 28, 2001 on JCOR Entertainment. It peaked at number 10 on the Billboard Top R&B/Hip-Hop Albums and at number 79 on the Billboard 200.

The album was originally supposed to be the Thug Lordz album with Yukmouth, which was slated for a fall 2000 release. The majority of Yukmouth's verses were removed and replaced with Brotha Lynch Hung's, with Lynch recording while C-Bo was still incarcerated.

West Coast Mafia Records, C-Bo's own label, and Siccmade Muzicc Brotha Lynch's label reissued Blocc Movement in 2002.

Track listing 
 "Intro" - 0:56
 "Gangsta (Fucc a Ho)" (featuring Kam) - 2:48
 "Follow My Lead" (featuring C.O.S. & Killa Tay) - 4:53
 "Flippin' Chiccens" - 4:30
 "187 on a Hook" (featuring Tech N9ne) - 4:25
 "The Watcher" - 3:15
 "We All Thug" (featuring C.O.S. & Tall Cann G) - 4:18
 "187 on 24th Street" - 5:11
 "Drunken Style" - 2:27
 "Dedication" - 5:00
 "Divide" (featuring Phats Bossi & C.O.S.) - 4:28
 "There It Is" - 4:37
 "Down at the Court House (Skit)" - 0:25
 "Money, Power, Respect" (featuring Spider Loc) - 3:50
 "The Plot" (featuring: Zigg Zagg) - 2:43
 "Where's My Checc? (Skit)" (featuring Zigg Zagg & Art B) - 0:46
 "My Papers" - 5:29
 "Kicc the Door In (Skit)" - 0:56
 "Don't Stop" (featuring Yukmouth & Spice 1) - 4:43
 "Outro" - 0:19

Chart history

References

External links 
 Blocc Movement at Discogs
 Blocc Movement at MusicBrainz

Brotha Lynch Hung albums
C-Bo albums
2001 albums
Albums produced by Bosko